Ctenophila is a genus  of small air-breathing land snails, terrestrial pulmonate gastropod mollusks in the family Euconulidae, the hive snails.

Species 
Species within the genus Ctenophila include:
 Ctenophila caldwelli
 Ctenophila salaziensis
 Ctenophila setiliris
 Ctenophila vorticella

References

 
Euconulidae
Taxa named by César Marie Félix Ancey
Taxonomy articles created by Polbot